Aqchari (also Romanized as Āqcharī and Āqjarī) is a village in Ziaran Rural District, in the Central District of Abyek County, Qazvin Province, Iran. At the 2006 census, its population was 111, in 51 families.

Aghchari has Special Horse breeding center which is located in very special area in Alborz mountains range .

References 

Populated places in Abyek County